Corps Locaux by Jean-Pierre Serre, originally published in 1962 and translated into English as Local Fields by Marvin Jay Greenberg in 1979, is a seminal graduate-level algebraic number theory text covering local fields, ramification, group cohomology, and local class field theory.  The book's end goal is to present local class field theory from the cohomological point of view.  This theory concerns extensions of "local" (i.e., complete for a discrete valuation) fields with finite residue field.

Contents
Part I, Local Fields (Basic Facts): Discrete valuation rings, Dedekind domains, and Completion.
Part II, Ramification: Discriminant & Different, Ramification Groups, The Norm, and Artin Representation.
Part III, Group Cohomology: Abelian & Nonabelian Cohomology, Cohomology of Finite Groups, Theorems of Tate and Nakayama, Galois Cohomology, Class Formations, and Computation of Cup Products.
Part IV, Local Class Field Theory: Brauer Group of a Local Field, Local Class Field Theory, Local Symbols and Existence Theorem, and Ramification.

References

Algebraic number theory
Class field theory
Graduate Texts in Mathematics